The 2016 Egypt flood was a natural disaster affecting the Assuit, Red Sea, Sohag, South Sinai and Qena governorates of Egypt in late October and early November. At least 26 people were killed and 72 injured.

See also 
 Geography of Egypt
 Red Sea

References

External links 
 http://reliefweb.int/disaster/fl-2016-000114-egy
 http://floodlist.com/africa/egypt-deadly-flash-floods-hit-sohag-red-sea
 

Natural disasters in Egypt
Egypt floods
2016 in Egypt 
2016 disasters in Egypt
October 2016 events in Egypt 
November 2016 events in Egypt